The Tolyatti bus bombing occurred on October 31, 2007, during the morning rush hour when a bomb exploded on a passenger bus in Tolyatti a city in Samara Oblast. The blast killed at least 8 people and injuring about 50 in what Irina Doroshenko, a spokeswoman for the investigative wing of the local prosecutor's office, said could be a terrorist attack. At the beginning of the investigation, it was believed to be the work of terrorists from the North Caucasian Federal District. Early reports indicated possible involvement of Chechen terrorist Doku Umarov. However, the officials later named a 21-year-old Evgeny Vakhrushev, who also died in the blast, as the only person to be responsible for the tragedy.

The explosion happened near a bus stop in the city center as people were heading to work.

References

21st-century mass murder in Russia
Attacks in Russia in 2007
Mass murder in 2007
Terrorist incidents in Russia in 2007
Tolyatti
October 2007 events in Russia
Attacks in Russia